Marcus E. Johnson was a member of the Wisconsin State Assembly.

Biography
Johnson was born on March 12, 1887, in Dane County, Wisconsin. He would become an instructor at the University of Wisconsin–Madison.

Political career
Johnson was elected to the Assembly in 1918. Additionally, he was a Madison, Wisconsin, alderman (similar to City Councilman). He was a Republican.

References

Republican Party members of the Wisconsin State Assembly
Wisconsin city council members
University of Wisconsin–Madison faculty
1887 births
Year of death missing